Eliton Deola (born April 19, 1983),  commonly known as Deola, is a Brazilian footballer who plays as a goalkeeper for América RJ.

Deola joined Sociedade Esportiva Palmeiras at age 17. He turned professional with the club, embarking on an extended tenure in which he won the Copa de Brasil.

Honours
Palmeiras
Copa do Brasil: 2012

Vitória
Campeonato Baiano: 2013

Fortaleza
Campeonato Cearense: 2015

References

1983 births
Living people
Brazilian footballers
Brazilian people of Greek descent
Campeonato Brasileiro Série A players
Campeonato Brasileiro Série B players
Campeonato Brasileiro Série C players
Sociedade Esportiva Palmeiras players
Grêmio Esportivo Sãocarlense players
Sociedade Esportiva Matonense players
Guarani FC players
Clube Atlético Juventus players
Grêmio Barueri Futebol players
Sertãozinho Futebol Clube players
Esporte Clube Vitória players
Clube Atlético Sorocaba players
Fortaleza Esporte Clube players
Clube Atlético Taboão da Serra players
Fluminense de Feira Futebol Clube players
Association football goalkeepers